Bushy Park is a town in Victoria, Australia, located on Briagolong Road, north of Maffra, in the Shire of Wellington.

Bushy Park Post Office opened on 1 November 1889 and closed in 1938.

References

Towns in Victoria (Australia)
Shire of Wellington